Air Vice Marshal Muhammad Nazrul Islam BSP, nswc, afwc, psc, GD (P) is the incumbent vice-chancellor of Bangabandhu Sheikh Mujibur Rahman Aviation and Aerospace University (BSMRAAU).  Prior to that appointment, he was Commander of Air Base Bashar. Before that, he served as Air Officer Commanding of BAF Base Bir Sreshtho Matiur Rahman in Jashore.

Career 
Being a fighter pilot, he commanded fighter squadrons and a BAF contingent in the United Nations peacekeeping mission in DR Congo. He also served as the Deputy Commandant and later as the Commandant of Bangladesh Air Force Academy(BAFA). During his tenure as Air Officer Commanding of Bangladesh Air Force (BAF) Base Birsrestho Matiur Rahman a joint military exercise took place with US Pacific Air Force named "Exercise Pacific Angel – 2019". BSMRAAU formally commenced its academic sessions on the Lalmonirhat campus during his time as VC.

References 

Bangladesh Air Force personnel
Bangladesh Air Force
Living people
1964 births